, born on October 8, 1981, in Higashihiroshima, Hiroshima, Japan) is a Japanese actor, best known for his role as Banban "Ban" Akaza/Deka Red in the 2004 Super Sentai series Tokusou Sentai Dekaranger. He is currently a freelance actor but was affiliated with Horipro until December 31, 2014. On April 1, 2015, he changed his name to "さいねい 龍二", the same reading.

Filmography

TV series
Gokusen (2002)'Gokusen Special (2003)Tokusou Sentai Dekaranger as Banban "Ban" Akaza/Deka Red (2004)Tokusou Sentai Dekaranger: Deka Red vs. Deka Break as Banban "Ban" Akaza/Deka Red (2004)Haruka 17 (2005)Fugo Keiji (2005)Fugo Keiji 2 (2006)Ns' Aoi (2006)Koi no Kara Sawagi Drama Special Love Stories IV (2007)Tsubasa No Oreta Tenshitachi 2 (2007)Sennyu Keiji Ranbo 2 (2007)Nanase Futatabi (2008)Fujoshi Deka (2008)My Girl (2009)Kaizoku Sentai Gokaiger as Banban "Ban" Akaza/Deka Red (episode 5 guest) (2011)Unofficial Sentai Akibaranger as himself/Banban "Ban" Akaza /Deka Red (episode 2 guest) (2012)Tokusou Sentai Dekaranger: 10 Years After as Banban "Ban" Akaza/Deka Red (2015)Uchu Sentai Kyuranger as Banban "Ban" Akaza/Deka Red (episode 18 guest) (2017)

Films
 Motorcycle (2002)
 Twilight (2003)
 Bo Taoshi! (2003)
 Tokusou Sentai Dekaranger The Movie: Full Blast Action as Banban "Ban" Akaza/Deka Red (2004)
 Tokusou Sentai Dekaranger vs. Abaranger as Banban "Ban" Akaza/Deka Red (2005)
 Chou Ninja Tai Inazuma! as Kuratanomiya (2006)
 Nekomekozo (2006)
 The Prince of Tennis as Keigo Atobe (2006)
 Drift 2 (2006)
 カチコミ刑事〜オンドリャー！大捜査線 心斎橋を封鎖せよ〜　(2006)
 Mahou Sentai Magiranger vs. Dekaranger as Banban "Ban" Akaza/Deka Red (2006)
 Chou Ninja Tai Inazuma!! SPARK as Kuratanomiya (2007)
 Kamen Rider Wizard in Magic Land as Captain of the Guards (2013)
 The Blood of Wolves (2018), Kikuchi
 Last of the Wolves (2021), Kikuchi

Musicals
 Saiyuki: Go West as Cho Hakkai (2008)
 Saiyuki: Dead or Alive as Cho Hakkai (2009)

DubbingPower Rangers S.P.D.'' as Jack Landors/SPD Red Ranger (2005, 2011)

References

External links
Official blog 

Japanese male television actors
Japanese male film actors
Actors from Hiroshima Prefecture
1981 births
Living people